Civic consumption is a model for social change that leverages shared buying power to reward socially responsible businesses. The model operates by gathering a group of consumers to leverage the group's size in order to expand access to a particular good or service. Some of the suggested benefits of the model are: providing people and organizations opportunities for civic action, increased access to necessary goods and services, and growing social outcomes across the economy.

History
The term first appeared in 2013, in a Fast Company article featuring Groundswell co-founder Will Byrne.

The model has been most prominently used in the clean energy sector by Groundswell. The organization suggests: One of the core barriers to a clean energy economy is that communities don’t have affordable access to renewable energy. Civic Consumption addresses this challenge by pooling consumer demand to grow the marketplace for renewably sourced power. The model, however, has expanded to increasingly include hybrid organizations which use market-driven models to accomplish social missions.

Civic Consumption Network
In 2013, Groundswell launched the Civic Consumption Network. The network includes organizations such as Freelancers Union, First Book, EveryoneOn, and Common Market.
In December 2013, with the support of the Ford Foundation, Rita Allen Foundation, and The Kendeda Fund, Groundswell hosted a national summit that connected the Civic Consumption Network members with innovators to discuss new strategies for social change in a changing economy.

Notable attendees included Sara Horowitz of Freelancers Union, Zach Leverenz of EveryoneOn, Kyle Zimmer of First Book, Andrew Kassoy of B Lab, Ted Howard of the Democracy Collaborative, Kimberly Lewis of the U.S. Green Building Council,  Sandy Wiggins of the Business Alliance for Local Living Economies (BALLE), Andrew Butcher of GTECH Strategies, Peter Corbett of iStrategylabs, and Mario Lugay of the Kapor Center for Social Impact.

See also
Collective buying power
Group purchasing organization

References 

Social economy